The Shillong Plateau is a plateau in eastern Meghalaya state, northeastern India. The plateau's southern, northern and western ridges form the Garo, Khasi and Jaintia Hills respectively.

The plateau shows numerous fracture lineaments in satellite images and has been subjected to extensive and compressive forces in the N-S and E-W direction respectively. Several deep earthquakes point to tectonic activity in the mantle, such as from the 1897 Assam earthquake along the blind Oldham Fault.

See also
Karbi-Meghalaya plateau.
1897 Assam earthquake
Dauki fault

References

External links
 INIST-CNRS
 Encyclopædia Britannica

Geology of India
Landforms of Meghalaya
Plateaus of India